Githurai is a composition of densely populated, urban, mixed-use settlements located at the border of Nairobi County and Kiambu County along the Thika superhighway. Githurai is divided into two; Githurai 45 (also known as Githurai Kimbo) and Githurai 44. Githurai 45 falls under Ruiru Constituency of Kiambu County with the boundary being the Thika Road reserve and River Kasarani (also known as River Gathara-ini) downstream. Githurai 44 is domiciled in Roysambu Constituency of Nairobi County. Githurai 44 neighbours Kahawa West, Zimmerman and Njatha-ini Village.

Infrastructure
Githurai is home to St Lucie Kiriri Girls High School and Kiriri Women's University of Science and Technology Lily Academy and St. Kizito Vocational Training Institute. Githurai is served by the Thika Road Super Highway and a branch of the Kenya-Uganda Railway from Nairobi to Thika via Ruiru. There exists a Kenya Army Amoury belonging to the Kahawa Garrison/Barracks in Githurai Kimbo. A Githurai Shopping Centre exists. Githurai Community Clinic is near, but not in Githurai. 
Other residential areas in the Nairobi include Kahawa, Kasarani, Dandora, Ongata Rongai and Ruai.

Politics
Githurai is widely regarded as the "gateway" to the Mount Kenya political bedrock. Politicians looking to cement their presence in the vote-rich mountain region often use the Githurai area as a launching pad of their politics.

See also
 Kahawa
 Kasarani
 Dandora
 Ongata Rongai

References

Suburbs of Nairobi